Kulov is a Slovak and Kyrgyz (Cyrillic: Кулов) masculine surname. Its feminine counterpart is Kulová in Slovak and Kulova in Kyrgyz (Cyrillic: Кулова). Notable people with the surname include:

 Felix Kulov (born 1948), Kyrgyz politician 
 Terézia Kulová (born 1997), Slovak footballer

Slovak-language surnames
Kyrgyz-language surnames